Jalaquduq District is a district of Andijan Region in Uzbekistan. The capital lies at the city Jalaquduq.

The district consists of 1 city (Jalaquduq), 7 urban-type settlements (Janubiy Olamushuk, Beshtol, Yorqishloq, Jalaquduq, Ko'kalam, Qo'shtepa and Oyim) and 8 rural communities.

References

Districts of Uzbekistan
Andijan Region